Sega Forever is a service from the Japanese video game developer Sega for re-releasing past games from the company on modern platforms. The service was launched for Android and iOS devices on June 22, 2017. By 2020, the service included over 30 games.

Background
Sega Forever is a service by Sega to re-release their previously developed video games on Android and iOS-based platforms. Games included on the service are free to play, although they display with advertisements that can be permanently disabled per-game by purchasing them. Game types vary between releases—while some are direct ports, others are emulated versions of the originals. While Sega stated that mobile devices were the initial focus for the service, they also stated it may also expand to other platforms in the future, such as PC and video game consoles. Similar to Nintendo's strategy of using mobile games and apps to attract attention to their console games, Sega hopes to release games to not only to promote their console games, but also to monitor game usage and use it as a metric to determine which franchises to make new games with in the future as well. The end-goal is to eventually create a service similar to Netflix for their games.

Games
The initial wave of games were from Sega's Genesis/Mega Drive, Game Gear, and Master System consoles, with the service later adding games from the Dreamcast, Sega CD, and arcade games. During the testing phases of the system, Sega Saturn and Dreamcast games did not perform satisfactorily, though Sega has on-going R&D efforts working on improving them in hopes of future release. Games such as Panzer Dragoon have been considered for the service, but could not be successfully emulated in the testing phase, meaning that such a release would hypothetically require a lengthy porting process instead. Sega is also open to releasing games that had not previously had English localizations, such as the Yuji Naka-designed game, Girl's Garden.

Games have new features added, such as leaderboards and cloud saves, and touchscreen controls, though they also have controller support as well. Games are also playable offline without an internet connection. Five games were available at launch, with more games being added over time. In March 2018, Sega announced their intention on releasing native ports, rather than emulated, for the service. Sega also stated that while they would continue to release emulated games, the change to primarily making native ports will result in fewer new games being released overall. At the same time, Sega announced that games on the service had been downloaded more than 40 million times.

List
† = Native ports as opposed to being emulated

Reception
Reception at launch was mixed, with critics noting that the service had a number of technical issues, mostly regarding the frame rate. Sega later resolved most of the issues in a July 2017 update.

References

External links
 

Sega video game compilations
Sega emulators
Online services
Mobile applications
Android (operating system) software
IOS software
2017 software
Sonic the Hedgehog
Virtua Tennis
Phantasy Star